KDB Afiat (20) is the fourth and last ship of the Ijtihad-class patrol boats. The vessel is in active service in the Royal Brunei Navy (RBN).

Development

Background 
A total of four Ijtihad-class fast patrol boats have been commissioned into service with the Royal Brunei Navy (RBN), where two of the ships began operating since March 2010 followed by another two on 28 August 2010.

Two Ijtihad-class fast patrol boats arrived in Brunei Darussalam on 27 August 2010. The boats, named Kapal Diraja Brunei (KDB) Syafaat and KDB Afiat were commissioned at the RBN Base in Muara, Brunei. They are part of the project between the government of His Majesty The Sultan and Yang Di-Pertuan of Negara Brunei Darussalam and Lürssen Werft.

The commissioning ceremony of both vessels was officiated by Major General Dato Paduka Seri Haji Aminuddin Ihsan bin Pehin Orang Kaya Saiful Mulok Dato Seri Paduka Haji Abidin, Commander of the Royal Brunei Armed Forces (RBAF). Like previous fast patrol boats, KDB Syafaat and KDB Afiat were produced in Germany and completed sea trials. KDB Ijtihad and KDB Berkat began operations on 15 March 2010.

Construction and career 
KDB Afiat was built by Lürssen Werft company in Germany around the 2009. She is part of the second batch delivered from Germany to Brunei. Afiat and KDB Syafaat commissioned together on 27 August 2010 at Muara Naval Base. All four of her sister ships work in the patrol craft role.

Exercise Hornbill 21/2011 
Royal Malaysian Navy and Royal Brunei Navy concluded Exercise Hornbill from 19 to 23 December 2011 which consists of KDB Afiat, KDB Ijtihad, KD Kedah and KD Ganas.

Exercise PELICAN 2013 
The Republic of Singapore Navy and the Royal Brunei Navy held a Naval exercise which consists of KDB Afiat, KDB Darulehsan, RSS Tenacious and RSS Valour in March 2013.

On 12 June 2017, KDB Afiat responded to a SOS call of 5 local fishermen being drifted to the sea after their engines stopped working. Afiat rescued and took all fishermen back to land where they are in good health. This is the second successful mission done by Royal Brunei Navy.

References 

Fast attack craft
Royal Brunei Navy
2009 ships
Ships of Brunei